The Innocent Sleep is a 1996 British thriller film directed by Scott Michell and starring Rupert Graves, Michael Gambon and Franco Nero. In the film, a homeless man witnesses a gangland killing and becomes a target himself; the film is inspired by the Roberto Calvi murder.

Cast
 Rupert Graves as Alan Terry 
 Hilary Crowson as Sheila Terry
 Annabella Sciorra as Billie Hayman 
 Michael Gambon as Det. Insp. Matheson 
 Franco Nero as Adolfo Cavani 
 John Hannah as James 
 Oliver Cotton as Lusano 
 Tony Bluto as Thorn 
 Paul Brightwell as Pelham 
 Campbell Morrison as Mac 
 Graham Crowden as George 
 Sean Gilder as Police Constable 
 Chris Jury as News Photographer 
 Laura Berkeley as Glamorous Blonde 
 Hugh Walters as Lewis 
 Crispin Redman as Simon, CID 
 Katie Carr as Alice 
 Chris Armstrong as Dave, CID 
 Lehla Eldridge as Morgue Attendant 
 Struan Rodger as Peter Samson 
 Stephen Yardley as Drago 
 Ken Ratcliffe as Stephens 
 Carmen De Venere as Cavani's Aide 
 Paul Gregory as Newsreader 
 Robert James as Hopkin 
 Susan Gilmore as News Programme Presenter 
 Peter Cartwright as Gerald Phillips 
 Julian Rivett as Bike Courier 
 Patrick Duggan as Landlord 
 Peter Howell as Sir Frank
 Stephen Haynes as CID Policeman

Box office
The film opened on 26 January 1996 on 66 screens in the United Kingdom and grossed £54,015 for the weekend, placing twelfth at the UK box office.

Home Media
The film was released in the following locations:
- Audio Visual Enterprises on Greek VHS in 1998
- Buena Vista Home Video on Netherlands VHS
- Payless Entertainment on Australian DVD in 2007
- Peachtree Video on US VHS in 1997
- Prooptiki in Greek theatrical locations in 1997
- Tango Entertainment on US DVD in 2005
- Trident Releasing on Non-US sales release in 1996

References

External links

1996 films
1996 thriller films
Films produced by Matthew Vaughn
British thriller films
1990s English-language films
1990s British films